Frank O'Driscoll is an Irish doctor and former rugby union international. He came from a rugby family - his son Brian and cousins Barry and John also all played rugby union for Ireland.

References

Date of birth missing (living people)
Living people
Irish rugby union players
20th-century Irish medical doctors
Frank
Year of birth missing (living people)